East Devon by-election may refer to: 

 1870 East Devon by-election
 1885 East Devon by-election